Anelle van Deventer (born 6 December 1993) is a South African field hockey player who plays for the South Africa women's national field hockey team. She received her debut Women's Hockey World Cup call during the 2014 Women's Hockey World Cup, where South Africa finished at ninth position. She also competed at the Commonwealth Games with the national team in 2014.

References

External links

1993 births
Living people
South African female field hockey players
Field hockey players at the 2014 Commonwealth Games
Commonwealth Games competitors for South Africa